Bolat Zhumadilov (Болат Жумадилов; born April 22, 1973) is a Kazakh boxer who competed in the Men's Flyweight (– 51 kg) at the 2000 Summer Olympics and won the silver medal. Four years earlier at the 1996 Summer Olympics he also captured the silver medal. He won the world title at the 1999 World Amateur Boxing Championships in Houston, Texas, United States.

Olympic results
1996
 Defeated Vladislav Neiman (Israel) 18-7
 Defeated Serhiy Kovganko (Ukraine) 21-4
 Defeated Damaen Kelly (Ireland) 13-6
 Defeated Zoltan Lunka (Germany) 23-18
 Lost to Maikro Romero (Cuba) 11-12

2000
 1st round bye
 Defeated Kennedy Kenyanta (Zambia) 12-9
 Defeated Vic Darchinyan (Armenia) 15-8
 Defeated Jérôme Thomas (France) 22-16
 Lost to Wijan Ponlid (Thailand) 12-19

References

External links
 

1973 births
Living people
Boxers at the 1996 Summer Olympics
Boxers at the 2000 Summer Olympics
Olympic boxers of Kazakhstan
Olympic silver medalists for Kazakhstan
People from Taraz
Olympic medalists in boxing
Boxers at the 1994 Asian Games
Boxers at the 1998 Asian Games
Kazakhstani male boxers
AIBA World Boxing Championships medalists
Medalists at the 2000 Summer Olympics
Medalists at the 1996 Summer Olympics
Asian Games competitors for Kazakhstan
Flyweight boxers